Gorny is a surname. Notable people with the surname include:

Frédéric Gorny (born 1973), French actor
Jan Górny (1907–1945), Polish boxer
Jan Górny (1933–2018), Polish field hockey player
Józef Górny (1936–2013), Polish footballer
Peter Gorny (born 1941), German rower
Yosef Gorny (born 1933), Israeli professor

See also
 

Polish-language surnames